The West End of London (commonly referred to as the West End) is a district of Central London, west of the City of London and north of the River Thames, in which many of the city's major tourist attractions, shops, businesses, government buildings and entertainment venues, including West End theatres, are concentrated.

The term was first used in the early 19th century to describe fashionable areas to the west of Charing Cross. The West End covers parts of the boroughs of Westminster and Camden.

While the City of London is the main business and financial district in London, the West End is the main commercial and entertainment centre of the city. It is the largest central business district in the United Kingdom, comparable to Midtown Manhattan in New York City, the 8th arrondissement in Paris, Causeway Bay in Hong Kong, or Shibuya in Tokyo. It is one of the most expensive locations in the world in which to rent commercial and office space.

History

Medieval London comprised two adjacent cities – the City of London in the east, and the City of Westminster in the west.

Over time they came to form the centre of modern London, although each kept its own distinct character and its separate legal identity (for example, the City of London has its own police force and is a distinct county). The City of London became a centre for the banking, financial, legal and professional sectors, while Westminster became associated with the leisure, shopping, commerce, and entertainment sectors, the government, and home to universities and embassies. The modern West End is closely associated with this area of central London.

Lying to the west of the historic Roman and medieval City of London, the West End was long favoured by the rich elite as a place of residence because it was usually upwind of the smoke drifting from the crowded City. It was close to the royal seat of power at the Palace of Westminster (now home to Parliament), and is largely contained within the City of Westminster (one of the 32 London boroughs).

Developed in the 17th, 18th and 19th centuries, it was built as a series of palaces, expensive town houses, fashionable shops and places of entertainment. The areas closest to the City around Holborn, Seven Dials, and Covent Garden contained poorer communities that were cleared and redeveloped in the 19th century.

Boundaries
As the West End is a term used colloquially by Londoners and is not an official geographical or municipal definition, its exact constituent parts are up for debate. Westminster City Council's 2005 report Vision for the West End included the following areas in its definition: Covent Garden, Soho, Chinatown, Leicester Square, the shopping streets of Oxford Street, Regent Street and Bond Street, the area encompassing Trafalgar Square, the Strand and Aldwych, and the district known as Theatreland. The Edgware Road to the north-west and the Victoria Embankment to the south-east were also covered by the document but were treated as "adjacent areas" to the West End.

According to Ed Glinert's West End Chronicles (2006) the districts falling within the West End are Mayfair, Soho, Covent Garden, Fitzrovia and Marylebone. By this definition, the West End borders Temple, Holborn and Bloomsbury to the east, Regent's Park to the north, Paddington, Hyde Park and Knightsbridge to the west, and Victoria and Westminster to the south. Other definitions include Bloomsbury within the West End.

One of the City of Westminster wards is called "West End". This electoral unit includes some of the most prosperous areas of the borough, including Soho, Mayfair and parts of southern Marylebone. The population of this ward at the 2011 Census was 10,575.

Notable streets

Albemarle Street
Baker Street
Bond Street
Carnaby Street
Charing Cross Road
Denmark Street
Great Marlborough Street
Great Portland Street
Harley Street
Haymarket
High Holborn
Jermyn Street
Kingsway
Old Compton Street
Oxford Street
Pall Mall
Park Lane
Piccadilly
Regent Street
Savile Row
Shaftesbury Avenue
Strand
The Mall
Wardour Street

Notable squares and circuses

The West End is laid out with many notable public squares and circuses.
Berkeley Square
Cambridge Circus
Cavendish Square
Grosvenor Square
Hanover Square
Hyde Park Corner
Leicester Square
Manchester Square
Marble Arch
Oxford Circus
Parliament Square
Piccadilly Circus
Portman Square
Russell Square
Soho Square
St James's Square
St Giles Circus
Trafalgar Square

Transport
London Underground stations in the West End include:

Baker Street
Bond Street
Charing Cross
Covent Garden
Embankment
Goodge Street
Great Portland Street
Green Park
Holborn
Hyde Park Corner
Leicester Square
Marble Arch
Oxford Circus
Piccadilly Circus
Regent's Park
Russell Square
Tottenham Court Road
Warren Street

References

Areas of London
Business improvement districts in London
Districts of the London Borough of Camden
Districts of the City of Westminster
International centres of London
London sub-regions
Retailing in London
Theatre districts